Ana Rosario Contreras is a Venezuelan human rights activist and nurse. She is the president of the Caracas Nurses Association. Contreras stands up for human rights and the need for democracy. This is in contrast to the governments habit of jailing torturing and harassing opponents. She was awarded an International Women of Courage Award in 2021.

References

Venezuelan human rights activists
Women human rights activists
Venezuelan women activists
Venezuelan activists
Recipients of the International Women of Courage Award
Year of birth missing (living people)
Living people